BIAP may refer to:

 Baghdad International Airport
 Biafran pound
 Biap